Obesotoma oyashio is a species of sea snail, a marine gastropod mollusk in the family Mangeliidae.

Description
The length of the shell attains 20 mm.

Distribution
This species is found in the Sea of Japan.

References

 Hasegawa, K., Okutani, T. and E. Tsuchida (2000) Family Turridae. In: Okutani, T. (ed.), Marine Mollusks in Japan. Tokai University Press, Tokyo, 619–667 (in Japanese).

External links
  Tucker, J.K. 2004 Catalog of recent and fossil turrids (Mollusca: Gastropoda). Zootaxa 682:1–1295.
 Biolib.cz: Obesotoma oyashio

oyashio
Gastropods described in 1962